Urohaustoriidae is a family of crustaceans belonging to the order Amphipoda.

Genera:
 Dirimus Barnard & Drummond, 1982
 Gheegerus Barnard & Drummond, 1982
 Huarpe Barnard & Clarke, 1982
 Narunius Barnard & Drummond, 1982
 Nepelle Barnard & Drummond, 1991
 Tottungus Barnard & Drummond, 1982
 Tuldarus Barnard & Drummond, 1982
 Urohaustorius Sheard, 1936
 Warragaia Berents, 1985

References

Amphipoda